Is It Fate? is an upcoming South Korean television series directed by Song Hyun-wook and starring Kim So-hyun, Chae Jong-hyeop, Yoon Ji-on, and Kim Da-som. It is based on Naver webtoon of the same name by writer Nam Ji-eun and illustrated by Kim In-ho, which was published in 2011.

Synopsis
The story of young people who meet their first love 10 years ago by chance and go on to find true love and dreams.

Cast

Main
 Kim So-hyun as Lee Hong-joo
 An animation production producer who is afraid of love due to a wound from her past love.
 Chae Jong-hyeop as Kang Hoo-yeong
 A financial planner whose heart began to fluctuate again after reuniting with his first love after 10 years.
 Yoon Ji-on as Bang Jun-ho
 A popular writer full of narcissism who develops a special relationship with Hong-joo, his number 1 fan, whom he met while publishing his first novel.
 Kim Da-som as Kim Hye-ji
 An English teacher at Ohbok High School and Lee Hong-joo's best friend.

Supporting 
 Hwang Seong-bin as Gyeong-taek
 A physics teacher at Ohbok High School who has had a crush on Kim Hye-ji for a long time.
Yoon Joon-won as Joseph Oh
 Hoo-yeong's close friend and important client, who comes from a wealthy family and immigrated to the United States. He graduated from law school and has excellent English skills.

Production

Development
The series is based on the 2011 webtoon Is It Fate? written by Nam Ji-eun and illustrated by Kim In-ho. This representative romance webtoon that marked the beginning of Naver's webtoon popularity. It is directed by Song Hyun-wook, who directed other works such as Another Miss Oh (2016), Revolutionary Love (2017), The Beauty Inside (2018) and The King's Affection (2021) among others. South Korean online news Xports News, reported that the drama is being discussed to release on tvN.

Casting
On August 8, 2022, it was reported that Kim So-hyun was in talks to star in the series for her next work since her drama River Where the Moon Rises ended in 2021. She then confirmed for the role in November 2022. On October 6, it was reported that Chae Jong-hyeop had received an offer for the role of the male protagonist in the drama, and was later confirmed for it. Yoon Ji-on's respective agency announced that he would also star in the show.

Filming
Is It Fate? is scheduled to begin filming in the second half of 2022.

References

External links
 

2023 South Korean television series debuts

Korean-language television shows
Television shows based on South Korean webtoons
South Korean romantic comedy television series
Upcoming television series